Erebonectes is a genus of crustacean in family Epacteriscidae, containing two troglobitic species. E. nasioticus was discovered in Bermuda and described in 1985; it is listed as critically endangered on the IUCN Red List. E. macrochaetus was found on Middle Caicos and described in 1994.

References

Calanoida
Freshwater crustaceans of North America
Taxonomy articles created by Polbot